Mighty Mouse in Gypsy Life is a 1945 Mighty Mouse cartoon that was nominated for an Oscar in the 18th Annual Academy Awards and is produced by Paul Terry and directed by Connie Rasinski. This film was originally released theatrically by 20th Century Fox.

Summary
In the cartoon, Mighty Mouse tries to save gypsy mice from cat bats.

Accolades
This is the only Mighty Mouse cartoon that was nominated for an Oscar even though it lost to a Tom and Jerry cartoon called Quiet Please!, released in 1945.

See also
1945 in film
Operetta

References

External links
IMDb

1945 films
Terrytoons shorts
American animated superhero films
Fictional representations of Romani people
American animated science fiction films
20th Century Fox short films
Films directed by Connie Rasinski
American animated short films
1945 animated films
1940s American animated films